Anne Lolk Thomsen (born 15 May 1983) is a Danish rower. She competed in the women's lightweight double sculls event at the 2016 Summer Olympics.

References

External links
 

1983 births
Living people
Danish female rowers
Olympic rowers of Denmark
Rowers at the 2012 Summer Olympics
Rowers at the 2016 Summer Olympics
Place of birth missing (living people)